Haven Mountain is a prominent mountain,  high, with a level razor-back snow ridge at its highest (eastern) part, standing  northeast of the Three Nunataks in the northwestern part of the Britannia Range. It was so named by the Darwin Glacier Party of the Commonwealth Trans-Antarctic Expedition (1956–58), who sheltered for five days in the largely snow-free area below the north side of the summit ridge.

External links 

 Haven Mountain on USGS website
 Haven Mountain on AADC website
 Haven Mountain on SCAR website

References

Mountains of Oates Land